Pa Saikou Kujabi (born 10 December 1986 in Serrekunda), is a retired Gambian footballer who played as a left back. Kujabi has previously played professionally for Grazer AK, SV Ried, FSV Frankfurt, Hibernian,  Whitehawk and Soham Town Rangers.

Career 
On 15 June 2009, he transferred from SV Ried to FSV Frankfurt and signed a one-year contract with an option for another year.  In January 2012 he went on trial at SPL side Hibernian and on 31 January 2012 it was announced he had signed an 18-month contract with the club. Kujabi made his first appearance for Hibernian in a 1–0 victory against Kilmarnock on 4 February. He was sent off in the 2012 Scottish Cup Final defeat against Hearts, effectively ending the match as a contest. Billy Dodds commented that Kujabi lacked physical presence and had poor defensive skills. Kujabi only made one appearance for Hibernian in the 2012–13 season, a 2–0 defeat by Queen of the South in the Scottish League Cup. He was made available for transfer in January 2013 and left the club at the end of his contract.

Following his departure from Edinburgh, Kujabi had unsuccessful trials with Portsmouth, Queens Park Rangers and West Ham United. During his trial at QPR he scored the winning goal in a 1-0 win over Harrow Borough.
Afterwards, the Gambian joined Whitehawk for one season where he gained a starting spot, but in July 2016, he retired from Football.

International
Kujabi is also a member of the Gambia national team and has earned 10 caps.

Career statistics

References

External links 
 
 

1986 births
Living people
Gambian footballers
The Gambia international footballers
Association football defenders
Austrian Football Bundesliga players
2. Bundesliga players
Scottish Premier League players
Grazer AK players
SV Ried players
FSV Frankfurt players
Hibernian F.C. players
Whitehawk F.C. players
Soham Town Rangers F.C. players
Gambian expatriate footballers
Expatriate footballers in Austria
Expatriate footballers in Germany
Expatriate footballers in Scotland